Malvina Polo (July 26, 1903 – January 6, 2000) was an American film actress. She appeared in several films between 1921 and 1924. She was the daughter of actor Eddie Polo.

She died in San Juan Capistrano, California.

Selected filmography

 The Yellow Streak (1921)
 Foolish Wives (1922)
 Der Fluch der Habgier (1922)
 A Woman of Paris (1923) directed by Charles Chaplin
 Wolves of the North (1924)

References

External links

1903 births
2000 deaths
20th-century American actresses
American film actresses